Josip Pejaković (born 5 March 1948) is a Bosnian actor and writer born in Travnik, Bosnia. At one time he was the lead singer for the Travnik-based rock group Veziri.  He was also an antiwar activist at the start of the Bosnian war. He was a member of the Advisory Board of the left-wing magazine Novi Plamen. 

He also hosts a show on Bosnian television called "Josip Pejaković - U ime naroda" (Josip Pejaković - In the name of the people).

Filmography 
 The Perfect Circle (1997)
 Zamka Za Ptice (1991)
 Gluvi barut (1990)
 Kuduz (1989)
 Vuk Karadžić (1988)
 Hasanaginica (1983)
 Ukazanje Gospe u selu Grabovica (1982)
 Ljudski faktor (1981)
 Osma ofanziva (1979)
 Porobdžije (1976)
 Odbornici (1975)
 Papirna (1973)
 Uvrijeđeni čovjek (1972)
 Hasanaginica

External links
 
 
 Novi Plamen

1948 births
Living people
Bosnia and Herzegovina male actors
Bosnia and Herzegovina male film actors
People from Travnik
Bosnia and Herzegovina writers
Croats of Bosnia and Herzegovina
Bosnia and Herzegovina comedians
Bosnia and Herzegovina stand-up comedians
Bosnia and Herzegovina humorists